The Stage Names is the fourth full-length studio album by American indie rock band Okkervil River, released on August 7, 2007. The album was recorded in Austin, Texas, with longtime Okkervil producer Brian Beattie, and with mixing from Spoon drummer and producer Jim Eno. Like other Okkervil River albums, the accompanying artwork is the work of artist William Schaff. The cover refers to a line from "Unless It's Kicks". The record was also released as a limited-edition 2-CD set that included a second disc of solo acoustic demos. A newly recorded version of "Love to a Monster", which appeared in rough demo form on the band's tour EP, Overboard and Down, was originally intended to appear on the album, but didn't make it on, and appears as a bonus track when the album is purchased through eMusic. "Shannon Wilsey on the Starry Stairs", described by lead singer and songwriter Will Sheff as "kind of a sequel to 'Savannah Smiles' and kind of a sister song to "John Allyn Smith Sails'", is included as a bonus track when the album is purchased through iTunes.

Overview
The Stage Names was originally conceived as a double album. Sheff said about the inspiration for the album, 

An official music video was created for "Our Life Is Not a Movie or Maybe" directed by Margaret Brown.

"A Hand to Take Hold of the Scene" describes the television shows in which Okkervil River's music has been featured. These include a 2006 episode of Cold Case ("One Night") and an episode of Breaking Bonaduce.

"Savannah Smiles" is a song that deals with the life and death of Shannon Wilsey, a pornographic actress known by her stage name, Savannah, which was taken from the 1982 film, Savannah Smiles. The bonus track, "(Shannon Wilsey on the) Starry Stairs," is intended to be a sequel to "Savannah Smiles."

"Plus Ones" references several other songs with numerical titles by adding 1 to them. These include ? and the Mysterians' "96 Tears," Nena's" 99 Luftballons," Paul Simon's "50 Ways to Leave Your Lover," The Byrds' "Eight Miles High," R.E.M.'s "7 Chinese Bros.," David Bowie's "TVC15," The Zombies' "Care of Cell 44," Commodore's "Three Times a Lady," and The Crests' "Sixteen Candles." The term is also used in reference to guest-lists at rock concerts.

"You Can't Hold the Hand of a Rock and Roll Man" makes a passing reference to The Bride Stripped Bare By Her Bachelors, Even by Marcel Duchamp. The title itself is taken from a line in the Joni Mitchell song, "Blonde in the Bleachers."

The song name "Title Track" is an openly self-reflexive gesture. The song also references Kenneth Anger's book Hollywood Babylon.

"John Allyn Smith Sails" concerns the life and suicide of confessional poet John Berryman (originally John Allyn Smith). The song ends by reworking the traditional folk song "Sloop John B" (made famous by The Beach Boys), likening death to a journey back home.

In addition to these specific allusions, several songs on the album have subjects like television, film, and the experience of being in a rock band.

Will Sheff has stated that he originally intended the album to be a double album and that he wrote twice as many songs for it than were used, many of which were completed or nearly completed. He had also stated that the band intended to release an EP of the unused material similar to Black Sheep Boy'''s companion EP Black Sheep Boy Appendix; however enough material existed for a full-length LP called The Stand Ins, which was released on September 9, 2008.

Reception

Reviews have been largely positive with Pitchfork labeling The Stage Names "Okkervil River's most emotionally devastating record yet, and without doubt one of the year's best" and placing it at #22 in their list of the best albums of 2007. The Stage Names has a Metacritic rating of 82. The album debuted at number 62 on the Billboard 200 with 10,000 copies sold. Harp Magazine listed the CD as the best of 2007 and the UK's now-defunct Teletext music magazine Planet Sound listed the album at #6 in their best albums of 2007. "Our Life is not a Movie or Maybe" was #81 on Rolling Stone's list of the 100 Best Songs of 2007.

Track listing

Bonus tracks
 "(Shannon Wilsey on the) Starry Stairs" – 3:54Bonus track available on iTunes "Love to a Monster" – 4:54Bonus track available on eMusic''

Musicians
 Will Sheff - Vocals, Acoustic Guitar, Electric Guitar, Xylophone, Piano
 Scott Brackett - Coronet, Hammond Organ, Synthesizer, Mellotron, Percussion
 Brian Cassidy - Vocals, Electric Guitar, Pedal Steel, Xylophone
 Jonathan Meiburg - Vocals, Piano, Wurloutzer, Pump Organ, Mellotron, Electric Guitar
 Travis Nelsen - Drums, Maracas, Tambourine, Shells
 Patrick Pestorius - Bass, Piano, Woodblocks
 Zachary Thomas - Mandolin
 Caitlin Bailey - Cello
 Scott Jackson - Violin
 Katie Nott - Viola
 Kathleen Pittman - Violin
 Sarah Pizzicheni - Violin
 Frances Smith - French Horn, Clarinet
 Will Thothong - Viola
 Tammy Vo - Violin

Charts

References

External links
Official site with lyrics

2007 albums
Okkervil River albums
Jagjaguwar albums